Lewis Osborne is a British actor best known for the Only Fools and Horses prequel, Rock and Chips

He was born in London in 1991 and attended The Brit School in Surrey where he studied acting.

Filmography
As actor:
 Rock and Chips 2010 - 2011
 Life of Riley 2011 
 Dead Man's Lake 2012

As self:
 Trust Me I'm a Teenager 2003

References

External links

21st-century British male actors
British male television actors
Male actors from London
1991 births
Living people